Svipdagr or Swipdag was a legendary Swedish king and important figure in Book One  of Gesta Danorum. The realm of his father was invaded by a Danish prince, Gram in order marry, Svipdagr's sister, Groa. The prince was eventually successful and Svipdagr's father, Sigtryg was killed. Svipdagr escaped to Norway and carved himself a kingdom of his own. Later, Gram's act to dishonor his wife compelled Svipdagr to invade Sweden. After Gram murdered the King of the Saxons many Saxons joined Svipdagr's side. The war continued many years and during this time Gram tried rape Svipdagr's daughter, finally, Svipdagr was able to kill Gram in battle and took over Sweden and Denmark.

Having won the war, Svipdagr installed his nephew, Guthorm as the puppet king of the Danes, while Guthorm's half-brother, Hading entered exile, but eventually returned and killed Svipdagr, leaving his son, Asmund to continue the war.

The text

References

Mythological kings of Denmark
Mythological kings of Sweden